Angel Delight is a powdered dessert product produced in the United Kingdom. It is designed to be mixed and whisked with milk to create a mousse-like sweet dessert.

Angel Delight was released in 1967 by the Bird's company, in a strawberries-and-cream flavour. By the 1970s, Bird's had doubled the market for instant desserts. After a lull in popularity during the 1980s, a revival campaign, featuring Wallace & Gromit, was run in 1999. In 2006 the brand was the best-selling line in the UK instant cold desserts sector. The brand is now owned by Premier Foods. The dessert was named Britain's 'favourite childhood dish' in a 2015 survey by Food Network.

Varieties
Angel Delight is currently sold in five flavours: strawberry, butterscotch, chocolate, mint chocolate and banana. No added sugar variants of the butterscotch, white chocolate and strawberry flavours are also sold. Currently, it is available in three quantity variants: four-serving packets, twelve-serving tubs and single-serving ready-to-eat cups (launched in 2017 in an attempt to modernise the brand, with an accompanying digital marketing campaign). Not all flavours are available in all size formats; for instance, tubs are only available in strawberry and butterscotch flavours.

Discontinued flavours include coffee, tea, coffee walnut, black cherry, blueberry, peach, lime, lemon, blackcurrant, bubblegum, tangerine, vanilla ice cream, forest fruits, popcorn, candy floss, butter mint and raspberry.

See also
 Bird's Custard
 Instant pudding

References

External links
Angel Delight official page

Products introduced in 1967
Premier Foods brands
Brand name desserts
British desserts